The term information continuum is used to describe the whole set of all information, in connection with information management. The term may be used in reference to the information or the information infrastructure of a people, a species, a scientific subject or an institution.

Other usages 

 in biological anthropology, term information continuum is related to study of social information transfer and evolution of communication in animals.
 the Internet is sometimes called an information continuum.

References

External links
 Monash University  - Faculty of Information Technology

Information theory
Information management